Eucereon flavicaput is a moth of the subfamily Arctiinae. It was described by George Hampson in 1898. It is found in Mexico, Guatemala and Costa Rica.

References

 

flavicaput
Moths described in 1898